Jan Niklas Schommer (born 28 December 1996) is a German footballer who plays as a forward for SV Allmersbach.

Career
Schommer made his professional debut for Sonnenhof Großaspach in the 3. Liga on 16 September 2014, coming on as a substitute in the 74th minute for Pascal Sohm in the 0–2 away loss against Energie Cottbus.

References

External links
 Profile at DFB.de
 Profile at kicker.de
 Profile at Fussball.de

1996 births
Living people
German footballers
Association football forwards
SG Sonnenhof Großaspach players
3. Liga players